Setting the Pace is an album by saxophonists Dexter Gordon and Booker Ervin recorded in Munich in 1965 and released on the Prestige label.

Reception
The Allmusic review stated "Although Gordon is in good form, Ervin (who sometimes takes the music outside) wins honors".

Track listing 
 "Setting the Pace" (Dexter Gordon) – 19:09
 "Dexter's Deck" (Dexter Gordon) – 22:47
 "The Trance" (Booker Ervin) – 19:37
 "Speak Low" (Weil-Nash) – 15:06

Tracks 3 and 4 were added to the 1992 digital remaster of "Setting The Pace"; originally released on "The Trance"

Personnel 
Booker Ervin, Dexter Gordon – tenor saxophone
Jaki Byard – piano
Reggie Workman – bass
Alan Dawson – drums

Recorded in Munich, Germany. October 27, 1965.
Digital remastering, 1992 by Phil De Lancie

References 

1965 albums
Prestige Records albums
Booker Ervin albums
Dexter Gordon albums
Albums produced by Don Schlitten